The 1995–96 FIBA Korać Cup was the 25th edition of FIBA's Korać Cup basketball competition. The Turkish Efes Pilsen defeated the Italian Stefanel Milano in the final. This was the first time a Turkish team won the title.

Controversy 
Since Efes Pilsen's Istanbul Factory is in Bahçelievler district, the basketball team of Efes Pilsen is considered the team of Bahçelievler. Saffet Bulut, who was the mayor of Bahçelievler, promised Efes that if they brought the trophy to Turkey, he would erect a statue of the team's success in the most beautiful place in the district. After Efes Pilsen won the Korać Cup, the mayor decided to erect a statue symbolizing the victory. But the metropolitan municipality prevents the district municipality from erecting the statue. Two months later Saffet Bulut met with the Mayor of Istanbul, Recep Tayyip Erdoğan and asked him why the statue was removed. Erdoğan claimed that the statue was of a beer glass, hence an advertisement for Efes. The statue was erected later on and is now currently on Talat Pasha Boulevard.

Team allocation 
The labels in the parentheses show how each team qualified for the place of its starting round:

 1st, 2nd, 3rd, etc.: League position after Playoffs
 WC: Wild card

First round

|}

Round of 64

|}
Qualified directly to the next round :

  Stefanel Milano
  Alba Berlin

Round of 32

|}

Round of 16

Group A

Group B

Group C

Group D

Quarterfinals

|}

Semifinals

|}

Finals

|}

See also 

 1995–96 Euroleague
 1995–96 FIBA European Cup

References

External links
 1995–96 FIBA Korać Cup @ linguasport.com
fibaeurope.com

1995-96
1995–96 in European basketball